Gustav IV Adolf or Gustav IV Adolph (1 November 1778 – 7 February 1837) was King of Sweden from 1792 until he was deposed in a coup in 1809. He was also the last Swedish monarch to be the ruler of Finland.

The occupation of Finland in 1808–09 by Russian forces was the immediate cause of Gustav's violent overthrow by officers of his own army. Following his abdication on 29 March 1809, an Instrument of Government was hastily written, which severely circumscribed the powers of the monarchy. The "Instrument" was adopted in 1809 on 6 June, the National Day of Sweden now as well as in his time. It remained in force until replaced in 1974. The crown, now with strictly limited powers, passed to Gustav's uncle Charles XIII, who had no legitimate children; this want of heirs set into motion the quest for a successor, who was found the following year in the person of Jean-Baptiste Jules Bernadotte, the first monarch of the present royal family.

Early life

Gustav Adolf was born in Stockholm. He was the son of Gustav III of Sweden by his wife queen Sophia Magdalena. His mother, Sophia Magdalena, was eldest daughter of Frederick V of Denmark and his first wife Louise of Great Britain. 

Gustav Adolf was under the tutelage of Hedvig Sofia von Rosen and her deputies Brita Ebba Celestina von Stauden and Maria Aurora Uggla until the age of four. He was then raised under the tutelage of his father and the liberal-minded Nils von Rosenstein. Upon Gustav III's assassination in March 1792, Gustav Adolf succeeded to the throne at the age of 14, under the regency of his uncle, Charles, duke of Södermanland, who was later to become King Charles XIII of Sweden when his nephew was forced to abdicate and was banished from the country in 1809.

In August 1796, his uncle the regent arranged for the young king to visit Saint Petersburg. The intention was to arrange a marriage between the young king and Grand Duchess Alexandra Pavlovna, a granddaughter of Catherine the Great. However, the whole arrangement foundered on Gustav's unwavering refusal to allow his intended bride liberty of worship according to the rites of the Russian Orthodox Church. Nobody seems to have suspected the possibility at the time that emotional problems might lie at the root of Gustav's abnormal piety. On the contrary, when he came of age that year, thereby ending the regency, there were many who prematurely congratulated themselves on the fact that Sweden had now no disturbing genius, but an economical, God-fearing, commonplace monarch.

Politics
Gustav Adolf's prompt dismissal of the generally detested Gustaf Adolf Reuterholm, the duke-regent's leading advisor, added still further to his popularity. On 31 October 1797 Gustav married Friederike Dorothea, granddaughter of Karl Friedrich, Margrave of Baden, a marriage which seemed to threaten war with Russia but for the fanatical hatred of the French republic shared by the Emperor Paul of Russia and Gustav IV Adolf, which served as a bond between them. Indeed, the king's horror of Jacobinism was intense, and drove him to become increasingly committed to the survival of Europe, to the point where he postponed his coronation for some years, so as to avoid calling together a diet. Nonetheless, the disorder of the state finances, largely inherited from Gustav III's war against Russia, as well as widespread crop failures in 1798 and 1799, compelled him to summon the estates to Norrköping in March 1800 and on 3 April the same year. When the king encountered serious opposition at the Riksdag, he resolved never to call another.

Loss of Finland

His reign was ill-fated and was to end abruptly. In 1805, he joined the  Third Coalition 
against Napoleon. His campaign went poorly and the French occupied Swedish Pomerania. When his ally, Russia, made peace and concluded an alliance with  France at Tilsit  in 1807, Sweden and Portugal were left as Great Britain's European allies. On 21 February 1808, Russia invaded Finland, which was ruled by Sweden, on the pretext of compelling Sweden to join Napoleon's Continental System. Denmark likewise declared war on Sweden. In just a few months after, almost all of Finland was lost to Russia. As a result of the war, on 17 September 1809, in the Treaty of Hamina, Sweden surrendered the eastern third of Sweden to Russia. The autonomous Grand Duchy of Finland within Imperial Russia was established.

Coup d'état and abdication

Gustav Adolf's inept and erratic leadership in diplomacy and war precipitated his deposition through a conspiracy of army officers.

On 7 March 1809, lieutenant-colonel Georg Adlersparre, commander of a part of the so-called western army stationed in Värmland, triggered the Coup of 1809 by raising the flag of rebellion in Karlstad and starting to march upon Stockholm. To prevent the King from joining loyal troops in Scania, on 13 March 1809 seven of the conspirators led by Carl Johan Adlercreutz broke into the royal apartments in the palace, seized the king, and imprisoned him and his family in Gripsholm castle; the king's uncle, Duke Charles (Karl), was thereupon persuaded to accept the leadership of a provisional government, which was proclaimed the same day; and a diet, hastily summoned, solemnly approved of the revolution.

On 29 March Gustav IV Adolf, to save the crown for his son, voluntarily abdicated; but on 10 May the Riksdag of the Estates, dominated by the army, declared that not merely Gustav but his whole family had forfeited the throne, perhaps an excuse to exclude his family from succession based on the rumours of his illegitimacy. A more likely cause, however, is that the revolutionaries feared that Gustav's son, if he inherited the throne, would avenge his father's deposition when he came of age. On 5 June, Gustav's uncle was proclaimed King Charles XIII, after accepting a new liberal constitution, which was ratified by the diet the next day. In December, Gustav and his family were transported to Germany. In 1812, he divorced his wife.

In exile Gustav used several titles, including Count Gottorp and Duke of Holstein-Eutin, and finally settled at St. Gallen in Switzerland where he lived in a small hotel in great loneliness and indigence, under the name of Colonel Gustafsson. It was there that he suffered a stroke and died. He was buried in Moravia. At the suggestion of King Oscar II of Sweden his body was finally brought to Sweden and interred in Riddarholm Church.

Arms

Ancestry

Family

In 1797 he married Frederica Dorothea Wilhelmina of Baden, with whom he had five children:

 Crown Prince Gustav, after 1809 known as Gustaf Gustafsson, Prince of Vasa (9 November 1799 – 1877). He served as an officer in the service of the Habsburgs of Austria, and with his wife Princess Louise Amelie of Baden, fathered a son who died in infancy, and a daughter, Carola, the wife of King Albert of Saxony. She died childless.
 Princess Sofia Wilhelmina (21 May 1801 – 1865). She married Grand Duke Leopold of Baden, and their granddaughter Victoria of Baden married the Bernadotte king Gustaf V of Sweden. (The present King Carl XVI Gustaf of Sweden is thus Gustav IV's heir.)
 Prince Carl Gustaf, Grand Duke of Finland, Duke of Småland (2 December 1802 – 10 September 1805)
 Princess Amalia (22 February 1805 – 31 August 1853); unmarried and without issue
 Princess Cecilia (22 June 1807 – 1844); married Augustus, Grand Duke of Oldenburg, and had issue.

By 1812, Gustav Adolf divorced his consort, and following this he had several mistresses, among them Maria Schlegel, who gave him a son, Adolf Gustafsson.

Notes

References
 H. Arnold Barton, Scandinavia in the Revolutionary Era, 1760–1815, 1986, .
 Sten Carlsson, Gustaf IV Adolf, 1946.

See also
 Gustavian era

External links

 
 
 

|-

1778 births
1837 deaths
18th-century Swedish monarchs
19th-century Swedish monarchs
Monarchs who abdicated
People from Stockholm
Crown Princes of Sweden
House of Holstein-Gottorp
Rulers of Finland
Modern child monarchs
Swedish monarchs of German descent
Burials at Riddarholmen Church
Sons of kings
Royal reburials